Pimp of the Year is the third studio album by pioneering jazz group Soil & "Pimp" Sessions, from Japan. It was released on March 8, 2006.

Track listing
Original Release (56:36)

Limited Edition (61:07)

Credits
Performed and arranged by Soil & "Pimp" Sessions
Toasting [Agitator] – Shacho
Saxophone – Motoharu
Trumpet – Tabu Zombie
Piano – Josei
Bass – Akita Goldman
Drums – Midorin
Mastered by Yasuji Maeda
Assistant Engineer (Mastering) - Yukie Fuse (Bernie Grundman Mastering)
Recorded and mixed by Koni-Yang from KURID (tracks 1, 4, 6, 11 & 13), Shinjiro Ikeda (tracks 2, 3, 5, 7, 8, 9, 10 & 12)
Executive Producer – Akira Sekiguchi (Victor), Katsunori Ueda (Victor)
Assistant Engineers – Hiromitsu Takasu, Yoshiyuki Watanabe (Victor Studio), Naoya Tokunou (Heart beat), Manabu Ito, Koudai Nakase (Innig)
A&R, Director – Yuichi Sorita (Victor)
Artist Promotion – Toyonobu Hatayama (Victor)
Sales Promotion – Yasuhiro Kanabo (Victor)
Photography – Shoji Uchida
Artwork by [Art Direction] – Yutaka Kimura (Central 67)
Hair and make-up - Michio Kutsukake
Objet - Suzuki Studio
Visual Coordination - Tomoro Watanabe (VDC)

References

2006 albums
Soil & "Pimp" Sessions albums